José Viegas Filho (born 14 October 1942 in Rio de Janeiro) is a Brazilian diplomat.

José Viegas served as Brazilian Ambassador to Denmark (1995–1998), to Peru (1998–2001) and to Russia (2001–2002). He was Minister of Defence in the Presidency of Luiz Inácio Lula da Silva in 2003 and 2004. He tendered in his resignation to the President of the Republic due to a crisis generated by a note released by the Social Communication Service of the Brazilian Army which defended the Military Régime.

In his note of resignation to the Ministerial office, José Viegas mentioned the incompatibility between the authoritarian philosophy based on the Doctrine of National Security and the full validity of the democratic institutions:

"The note released on Sunday 17 represents the persistency of an authoritarian philosophy, linked to the remains of the old and anachronistic doctrine of national security, incompatible with the full validity of democracy and with the development of Brazil in the 21st century. It is high time for the representatives of this dated philosophy to walk out of the scene."

In 2005, José Viegas Filho resumed his diplomatic career as Brazilian Ambassador to Spain and in 2009 became Brazilian Ambassador in Italy, which office he continues to hold at present.

He is married to Ericka Stockholm, a Peruvian writer of children tales. She was a famous actress in Peru in the decade of 80's and 90's.

References
The information on this page is based on its counterpart on Portuguese Wikipedia, accessed 1 December 2010.

1942 births
Living people
Ambassadors of Brazil to Denmark
Ambassadors of Brazil to Spain
Ambassadors of Brazil to Italy
Ambassadors of Brazil to Peru
Ambassadors of Brazil to Russia
Defence ministers of Brazil
People from Rio de Janeiro (city)